Thomas Maddock's Sons Company was founded by Thomas Maddock.

History 
The firm was originally named 'Millington & Asthury, before Maddock joined it in 1872. It was subsequently renamed 'Millington, Astbury & Maddock the next year. When Millington left, it became Asthury & Maddock, before assuming the name Thomas Maddock & Sons upon the departure of Asthury. The plant is in Hamilton Township, New Jersey. It was built in 1924-25 and manufactured sanitary ware.

Later it was purchased by American Standard in 1929 and production continued until 2002.  The site lies adjacent to the Hamilton Train Station on the Northeast Corridor Line.  It has been redeveloped as offices and is the centerpiece of transit-oriented development around the station.

The building's original address was 240 Princeton Avenue but now lies on American Metro Boulevard.

See also
Thomas Maddock
National Register of Historic Places listings in Mercer County, New Jersey

References

Bibliography
 

Industrial buildings and structures on the National Register of Historic Places in New Jersey
Hamilton Township, Mercer County, New Jersey
National Register of Historic Places in Mercer County, New Jersey
New Jersey Register of Historic Places
Toilets